Littoraria cingulifera is a species of sea snail, a marine gastropod mollusk in the family Littorinidae, the winkles or periwinkles.

Distribution
This species is present in the North Atlantic Ocean, West African Coast.

Description

References

Littorinidae
Gastropods described in 1845